The Felix Y. Manalo National Historical Landmark, also known as the Felix Manalo Shrine, is a memorial and plaza in Taguig, Philippines recognized as a National Historical Landmark. The site marks the birthplace of the Iglesia ni Cristo founder and leader Felix Manalo.

Background
The Felix Y. Manalo National Historical Landmark is a  plaza situated in Barangay Calzada in Taguig, Philippines. The site marks the birthplace of Felix Manalo who was born on May 10, 1886 at the time Taguig was still a town that is part of Rizal province. Manalo is widely regarded by non-members as the founder of Iglesia ni Cristo who registered the church with the Philippine government in 1914. The area where the landmark stands is believed to be the site of the former ancestral house of Manalo's family.

Manalo's birthplace was proclaimed as a National Historical Landmark by the National Historical Institute on January 6, 1986.

Notes

References

Tourist attractions in Metro Manila
Taguig
Iglesia ni Cristo
Plazas in the Philippines
National Historical Landmarks of the Philippines
Birthplaces of individual people